The Brand–Watts Ministry was the 23rd Ministry of the Government of Western Australia, led by Liberal Premier David Brand and his deputy, Country Party leader Arthur Watts. It succeeded the Hawke ministry on 2 April 1959, following the defeat of the Labor government at the 1959 election twelve days earlier. It was succeeded by the Brand–Nalder Ministry on 1 February 1962 following the Deputy Premier's retirement from politics.

The Ministry

On 2 April 1959, the Governor, Sir Charles Gairdner, constituted the Ministry. He designated 10 principal executive offices of the Government and appointed the following ministers to their positions, who served until the end of the Ministry.

The list below is ordered by decreasing seniority within the Cabinet, as indicated by the Government Gazette and the Hansard index. Blue entries indicate members of the Liberal Party, whilst green entries indicate members of the National Country Party. The members of the Ministry were:

References

Brand 1
Ministries of Elizabeth II